George Colin Jones (8 September 1940 – 25 October 2016) was an English footballer. He played in The Football League for Chester.

A wing half, Jones was one of several youngsters to get his first-team chance with Chester in the closing stages of the 1959–60. But he only enjoyed three outings for the club before joining Wrexham, where he failed to make a league appearance.

Bibliography

References

1940 births
2016 deaths
Sportspeople from Chester
English Football League players
Association football midfielders
English footballers
Chester City F.C. players
Wrexham A.F.C. players